National Highway 427 (NH 427) is an east–west national highway in India that starts from Howly and terminates in Jalukbari. The highway passes through the north bank districts of Western Assam. NH-427 was laid and is maintained by Central Public Works Department (CPWD).

References

National highways in India
National Highways in Assam